Christian Baudelot (born 9 December 1938, Paris) is a French sociologist based at the École normale supérieure. Many of his works have been written in collaboration with Roger Establet.

Works
 (tr. with Pierre Clinquart) Anthropologie by Edward Sapir, 1967.
 (with Roger Establet) L'ecole capitaliste en France, 1971
 (with Roger Establet and Jacques Malemort) La petite bourgeoisie en France, 1974
 (with Roger Establet, Jacques Toiser and P. O Flavigny) Qui travaille pour qui, 1979
 (with Roger Establet) Durkheim et le suicide, 1984
 (with Roger Establet) Le Niveau monte, 1989
 (with Roger Establet) Allez les filles!, 1992
 (with Roger Establet) Maurice Halbwachs: consommation et société, 1994
 (with M. Gollac,  Céline Bessière et al) Travailler pour être heureux? le bonheur et le travail en France, 2003
 (with Roger Establet) Suicide: l'envers de notre monde, 2006. Translated into English as Suicide: The Hidden Side of Modernity, 2008
 (ed. with Marie Jaisson) Maurice Halbwachs, sociologue retrouvé, 2007
 (with Roger Establet) L'élitisme républicain: l'école française à l'épreuve des comparaisons internationales, 2009

References

Cécile Daumas, "Le don de soi", Libération, 6 February 2010.

External links
 Webpage at the ENS

1938 births
Living people
French sociologists
French male writers